GC Biaschesi is a Swiss football club from the town of Biasca in Canton Ticino, the Italian-speaking region of Switzerland. The team currently plays in Liga 1., the third highest tier in the Swiss football pyramid. The club narrowly missed out on promotion to the Challenge League after losing a play off match in May 2008, against FC Stade Nyonnais. Finished the 2008/2009 season in 13th position.

Stadium

GC Biaschesi play their home games at Campo Sportivo "Al Vallone". The total capacity is 2,850. The stadium has 350 seats and 2,500 standing places.

External links
Official Website 
Soccerway.com profile 
Football.ch profile 

Biaschesi
Association football clubs established in 1941
Biasca
1941 establishments in Switzerland